Glenothrips is a genus of thrips in the family Phlaeothripidae.

Species
 Glenothrips biuncinatus

References

Phlaeothripidae
Thrips genera